Prielbrusye National Park (also, Prielbrus'e, in English, "Mount Elbrus") is centered on Mount Elbrus, the highest mountain in Europe at 5,642 meters above sea level. The relative isolation of steep gorges has led to high levels of endemism and biodiversity. The park is in the central Caucasus Mountains, one of 22 national parks in the Caucasus of different nationalities, covering 1.8% of the region. The park is situated in Elbrussky District and Zolsky District, in the southwestern corner of the Kabardino-Balkar Republic of Russia.

Topography
Prielbrusye National Park is located on the peaks and north slope of the central Caucasus Mountains, with some southern slope areas, at elevations ranging from 1400 – 5642 meters.  The terrain includes mountain peaks and side-ridges, glaciers, lava flows, lake basins, and lower elevations, a limited system of forested river valleys. Mount Elbrus is on the western boundary of the park, on the border with the Karachay-Cherkess Republic.  The headwaters of the Malka River form in the glaciers of Elbrus and through a plateau below the glacial source, flowing north and east.  The Baksan River flow to the east of the mountain through the southern tier of the park.  On the southern border of the park is the national border with Georgia.  Approximately 155 km2., or about 15.3% of the territory of the park, is either glacier or permanent snow.

Ecoregion and climate
Prielbrusye is located in the Caucasus mixed forests, one of the most biologically diverse ecoregions in the world.  The diversity is due to the meeting of different ecological zones, and to the elevation variation.

Because of its elevation, Prielbrusye has an Arctic climate (Köppen climate classification, (ET)).  This is a local climate in which at least one month has an average temperature high enough to melt snow (0 °C (32 °F)), but no month with an average temperature in excess of 10 °C (50 °F).  Actual temperatures in Prielbrusye show extreme variation, however, due to the extreme elevation differentials.

Flora and fauna
Elevation zones drive the flora of the park.  At the lowest elevations in the river valleys are deep coniferous forests of mostly pine.  The under story at this level is a mixture of juniper, barberry, and wild rose.  Where the areas are wetter, the under story includes thickets of wild raspberries, currants, and gooseberries.  Above that is a thin belt of broadleaf trees and shrubs in the sub-alpine zone.  Above that are alpine meadows and finally snow, rock and ice at the highest levels.

The most common forest mammals are steppe wolves, European jackals, red foxes, Caucasian lynx, wild boars and Syrian brown bears.

Tourism
Prielbrusye is a center for mountain sports - skiing, hiking and climbing.  The park also supports camping, all-terrain vehicle tours, and eco-tours.  Tourism, by both residents and foreigners, is encouraged, and there are facilities within the park (there are six small settlements within the boundaries of the park.)  The park is 90 km west of the city of Nalchik.

See also
 Protected areas of Russia
 National parks of Russia
 Nature Reserves of Russia (zapovedniks)

References

External links
 Map of Prielbrus'e at ProtectedPlanet

National parks of Russia